Barbara Crampton (born December 27, 1958) is an American actress and producer. She began her career in the 1980s in television soap operas before starring in horror and thriller films—both paths would define her continued accolade-winning career.

Crampton made her television debut on the daytime drama Days of Our Lives (1983–84) before a supporting role as Leanna Love on the soap opera The Young and the Restless (1987–93, 1998–2002, 2006–07). Later in her career, she would appear in television horror anthologies such as Syfy's Channel Zero: The Dream Door (2018), Hulu's Into the Dark (2019), and Shudder's Creepshow (2021).

She made her film debut in Body Double (1984), but received recognition in the comedy horror film Re-Animator (1985) as Megan Halsey and the science fiction film From Beyond (1986) as Dr. Katherine McMichaels. Later defining roles are Chopping Mall (1986), Puppet Master (1989), Castle Freak (1995), You're Next (2011), We Are Still Here (2015), Little Sister (2016), Puppet Master: The Littlest Reich (2018), and Jakob's Wife (2021), for which she was nominated for Critics' Choice Super Awards.

Early life
Crampton was born December 27, 1958, in Levittown, Long Island, New York. She was raised Roman Catholic. Crampton grew up in Vermont, and spent summers traveling the country with the carnival, as her father was a carny. She started acting in school plays when she was in seventh grade and went on to study acting in high school. She attended Castleton State College in Vermont graduating with a Bachelor of Arts degree in Theater Arts. After graduation, Crampton made a brief stop in New York, where she appeared as Cordelia in King Lear for the American Theater of Actors. She was a Theater Arts Major at Castleton State College from 1976 to 1981.

Career
From New York, Crampton moved to Los Angeles where she made her television debut on the daytime drama Days of Our Lives, where she played Trista Evans Bradford and subsequently starred in the pilot episode of Rituals, the television film Love Thy Neighbor, and the television series Santa Barbara. She made her film debut in the 1984 film Body Double. The following year, Crampton portrayed Chrissie in Fraternity Vacation, Megan Halsey in Re-Animator, and Stacy in Hotel. In 1986, Crampton portrayed Suzie Lynn in Chopping Mall, Dr. Katherine McMichaels in From Beyond, and Anne White in Prince of Bel Air. In 1987, Crampton was cast in Kidnapped and portrayed Teri in Ohara. From 1987 to 2007, Crampton portrayed Leanna Love in The Young and the Restless. In 2023, she returned to role for the show’s 50th anniversary. In 1989, Crampton had a cameo role in the horror film Puppet Master. In 1991, Crampton portrayed Sadie Brady in Trancers II.

In 1993, Crampton portrayed archeologist Dr. Leda Fanning in Robot Wars with Don Michael Paul. That year she also guest starred on Civil Wars and portrayed Mindy Lewis on Guiding Light from 1993 to 1995 and left when her contract expired and when she got engaged to L.A.-based actor and director Kristoffer Tabori in April 1995. By September of the same year, their engagement was called off. In 1995, Crampton starred in Castle Freak. From 1995 to 1998, Crampton portrayed Maggie Forrester on The Bold and the Beautiful. In 1996, Crampton portrayed Carol in Space Truckers. In 1997, Crampton guest starred on The Nanny. The following year, she guest starred on Party of Five and starred in the film The Godson. In 1999, Crampton guest starred on the television series Pacific Blue.

In 2001, Crampton had a recurring role as Dr. Leslie Bogan in 5 episodes of the television series Spyder Games and starred in Thy Neighbor's Wife. In 2004, Crampton starred in The Sisterhood. She subsequently starred in Read You Like a Book (2006) and Never Enough (2008). Crampton was a special guest at Creation Entertainment's Weekend of Horror 2010. She had a supporting role in the 2011 horror slasher film You're Next and played the leading role Anne Sacchetti in We Are Still Here (2015), co-starring Lisa Marie and Larry Fessenden. Both films received positive reviews from critics.

Crampton next appeared in Abner Pastoll's "taut Euro thriller" Road Games, in which she speaks both French and English. In 2015 she starred along with Robert Englund, Danny Trejo, Kane Hodder, Bill Moseley, Michael Berryman, Doug Bradley, Gunnar Hansen, Ken Foree and Dee Wallace in the Harrison Smith horror film Death House.

In 2018, Crampton was given the prestigious Horror Channel Lifetime Achievement Award at Grimmfest in Manchester, United Kingdom.

In 2021, Crampton produced and starred in the horror-drama Jakob's Wife, which she personally developed over the course of several years. The same year, she voiced serial killer Nicolette Aster in an audio drama adaptation of Our Lady of the Inferno and appeared in the Lovecraftian film Sacrifice. In 2021, she also did a voice role for the first-person shooter video game Back 4 Blood (2021) as Mom.

Personal life
In December 1986, Crampton appeared in a nude pictorial in Playboy magazine titled "Simply Beastly. Behind every successful monster, there's a woman."

She married director of photography David Boyd on October 1, 1988. They divorced in 1990.

As of 2015, Crampton lives in Mill Valley, California, with her husband, and their three children.

Filmography

Film

Television

References

External links

 
 
 

Living people
20th-century American actresses
21st-century American actresses
Actresses from Vermont
American film actresses
American soap opera actresses
People from Levittown, New York
Castleton State College alumni
1958 births